Gabba Gabba Hey: A Tribute to the Ramones is a Ramones tribute album. While many recorded tributes to the Ramones would be recorded subsequently, this was the first such effort. It was released in 1991 on the Triple X label. The record is named after the band's famous slogan Gabba Gabba Hey, from the song "Pinhead" on their album Leave Home.

Track listing

References

Gabba Gabba Hey: A Tribute to the Ramones

1991 compilation albums
Ramones tribute albums
Punk rock compilation albums